Norman Wilkinson (8 August 1882, Handsworth Wood – 14 February 1934, London) was a British stage designer.

He was educated at the New School and the Birmingham School of Art.  He designed scenery and costumes for Granville Barker at the Duke of York's Theatre and the Savoy Theatre.  In the Savoy production of A Midsummer Night's Dream his costumes for the fairies included gilded faces and wigs, a choice which received some criticism.  He also did work for the Phoenix Society.  He referred to himself as "Norman Wilkinson of Four Oaks" to distinguish himself from the artist, Norman Wilkinson.  When he died, on 15 February 1934, some newspapers reported that it was the artist who had died.

References 

1882 births
1934 deaths
British scenic designers
People from Handsworth, West Midlands